The 2021 Women's African Nations Volleyball Championship is the 20th edition of the Women's African Volleyball Championship, a biennial international volleyball tournament organised by the African Volleyball Confederation (CAVB) with Rwanda Volleyball Federation (FRVB). The tournament is held in Kigali, Rwanda from 12 to 20 September 2021. The top two teams of the tournament will qualify for the 2022 FIVB Volleyball Women's World Championship as the CAVB representatives.

Qualification
9 teams have registered to participate in the 2021 African Championship.

Pools composition
Ranking from the previous edition was shown in brackets except the host and the teams who did not participate, which were denoted by (–).
The host country and the top 8 ranked teams were seed in the Serpentine system. The 4 remaining teams were drawn in Kigali, Rwanda on 11 September 2021.

Squads

Venue

Pool standing procedure
 Number of matches won
 Match points
 Sets ratio
 Points ratio
 Result of the last match between the tied teams

Match won 3–0 or 3–1: 3 match points for the winner, 0 match points for the loser
Match won 3–2: 2 match points for the winner, 1 match point for the loser.

Group stage
All times are Central Africa Time (UTC+02:00).

Pool A

|}

Notes
1  was forfeited by FIVB because Rwanda illegally registered four foreigners without due process.
2  was withdrawn from this competitions.
3 This match was canceled.

Pool B

|}

Notes
1 This match was canceled.

Final round
All times are Central Africa Time (UTC+02:00).

5th place match

Final Four

Semifinals

3rd place match

Final

Final standing

Awards

Most Valuable Player
 Christelle Tchoudjang Nana
Best Spiker
 Sharon Chepchumba
Best Blocker
 Gladys Ekaru
Best Server
 Laetitia Moma Bassoko
Best Setter
 Alexandra Erhart
Best Receiver
 Mercy Moim
Best Libero
 Yousra Souidi

See also
2021 Men's African Nations Volleyball Championship

References

 2021 CAVB WChampionship Final: Cameroon grabs 3rd consecutive crown ahead of Kenya
 Cameroon complete African Championship three-peat

External links
Official website

Women's African Volleyball Championship
African Women's Volleyball Championship
Women's African Volleyball Championship
2021 in Rwandan sport
Sports competitions in Rwanda
African Volleyball Championship